Blue Creek Township may refer to the following townships in the United States:

 Blue Creek Township, Adams County, Indiana
 Blue Creek Township, Paulding County, Ohio